Whitney Township is a civil township of Arenac County in the U.S. state of Michigan. The population was 1,001 at the 2010 census.

Geography

Demographics
As of the census of 2000, there were 1,033 people, 437 households, and 319 families residing in the township. The racial makeup of the township was 98.94% White, 0.29% Native American, 0.29% Asian, 0.29% from other races, and 0.19% from two or more races. Hispanic or Latino of any race were 2.13% of the population.

There were 437 households, out of which 20.1% had children under the age of 18 living with them, 65.7% were married couples living together, 4.3% had a female householder with no husband present, and 26.8% were non-families. 23.3% of all households were made up of individuals, and 13.3% had someone living alone who was 65 years of age or older.  The average household size was 2.34 and the average family size was 2.71.

In the township the population was spread out, with 19.8% under the age of 18, 4.6% from 18 to 24, 20.0% from 25 to 44, 31.5% from 45 to 64, and 24.0% who were 65 years of age or older.  The median age was 50 years. For every 100 females, there were 97.1 males.  For every 100 females age 18 and over, there were 99.5 males.

The median income for a household in the township was $32,989, and the median income for a family was $37,679. Males had a median income of $39,375 versus $24,583 for females. The per capita income for the township was $18,326.  About 9.1% of families and 10.9% of the population were below the poverty line, including 14.5% of those under age 18 and 7.4% of those age 65 or over.

References

External links
Whitney Township official website

Townships in Arenac County, Michigan
Townships in Michigan
Populated places on Lake Huron in the United States